The FIA WTCR Race of the Czech Republic is a round of the World Touring Car Cup, which is held at the Autodrom Most in the Czech Republic.

The race took place between 2006 season and 2011 season in the Masaryk Circuit.

Winners

Czech Republic
Czech republic
Race of the Czech Republic